Famelica polyacantha is a species of sea snail, a marine gastropod mollusk in the family Raphitomidae.

Description
The length of the shell varies between 5 mm and 12 mm.

Distribution
This marine species occurs off the Philippines

References

 Stahlschmidt P., Chino M. & Kilburn R.N. (2012) Two new Veprecula species (Gastropoda: Raphitomidae) from the Philippines. Miscellanea Malacologica 5(6): 99-103.
 Chino, M. & Stahlschmidt, P. (2021). Description of a new Famelica species (Gastropoda: Raphitomidae) from the Philippines. Gloria Maris. 60(4): 184-187.

External links
 Criscione, F., Hallan, A., Puillandre, N. & Fedosov, A. (2021). Snails in depth: integrative taxonomy of Famelica, Glaciotomella and Rimosodaphnella (Conoidea: Raphitomidae) from the deep sea of temperate Australia. Invertebrate Systematics. 35: 940-962
 Gastropods.com: Veprecula polyacantha

polyacantha
Gastropods described in 2012